Allium rhynchogynum is a Chinese species  of wild onion endemic to the Yunnan region in southern China. It grows at elevations of 2700–3200 m.

Allium rhynchogynum has scapes up to 25 cm long. Leaves are flat, sword-shaped, shorter than the scape, up to 10 mm wide. Umbels have only a few pink flowers.

References

rhynchogynum
Onions
Flora of Yunnan
Plants described in 1912